Rathanadav, also called Carron Henge, Rathnadob, Rathnadov or Fort Aengus (after Óengus mac Nad Froích),  is a ringfort (rath) and henge, and a National Monument located in County Tipperary, Ireland.

Location

Description
Inside are five low mounds which may contain burials or
maybe the remains of internal structures.

References

Archaeological sites in County Tipperary
National Monuments in County Tipperary